San Geronimo Creek is a stream in Marin County, California, United States, which feeds into Lagunitas Creek below Kent Lake.

Course
The creek rises in the hills west of the town of Fairfax.  It descends northward to Woodacre, where it turns westward and parallels Sir Francis Drake Boulevard through the villages of San Geronimo, Forest Knolls, and Lagunitas.  It then turns southwestward and joins Lagunitas Creek at the eastern edge of the Samuel P. Taylor State Park.

Ecology
The 6000 acre San Geronimo Creek watershed is within the 60,000 acre Lagunitas Creek Watershed, which is home to the largest-remaining wild run of coho salmon in central California. These coho are part of the "Central California Coast Evolutionarily Significant Unit," or CCC ESU, and are listed as "endangered" at both the state and federal level.

Efforts are also being made to protect and restore streams and habitat in the San Geronimo Valley, where upwards of 20% of the Lagunitas salmon spawn each year and where as much as 1/5 of the juvenile salmon (or fry) spend their entire freshwater lives.

There are jump pools and a fish ladder.

Bridges
At least seven bridges span San Geronimo Creek:

See also
List of watercourses in the San Francisco Bay Area

References

Rivers of Marin County, California
Rivers of Northern California
West Marin